Snapshot (also known as The Day After Halloween and One More Minute in the US) is a 1979 Australian thriller film directed by Simon Wincer in his feature film directorial debut. It stars Sigrid Thornton, Chantal Contouri and Robert Bruning. The film was shot on an estimated budget of $300,000.

Plot
Angela, a young, naive hairdresser in Melbourne dreams of saving enough money to leave the country and live abroad, but is under the thumb of her overbearing, puritanical mother who oversees Angela's finances. One day, Angela is pushed by one of her clients, Madeline, a glamorous model, to pursue print modeling. Angela reluctantly agrees, and completes an outdoor photoshoot with a photographer named Linsey in which she is coaxed into posing nude on the beach.

After attending a party with Madeline, Angela returns home to find her mother has locked her out, later discovering she did so upon finding that Angela was modeling. Her ex-boyfriend Daryl, an ice cream truck driver, arrives, and the two get into an argument; he wants to rekindle their relationship, but Angela has no interest. With nowhere to go, Angela returns to Linsey's home and he allows her to spend the night. Angela soon finds herself absorbed into the modeling world, and is subsequently approached by her mother, who requests Angela pay for medical bills accrued by her younger sister.

Angela visits Elmer, the wealthy owner of the modeling agency, at his mansion for a supposed barbecue. Once there, she finds she is the sole guest. Elmer regales Angela, telling he will be able to get her widespread exposure, even assuring her he can help her attain an acting career in Los Angeles. Elmer convinces Angela to undress and begins to photograph her, but she abruptly leaves, sensing that she has been exploited. Angela returns to the home she is sharing with Linsey and several other models, and is notified by her roommate Wendy that a man dropped off a bag of her belongings. Worried it is Daryl, there to harass her, she grows anxious. In her bed, Angela finds a severed pig's head in her bed.

Later, Angela is offered a modeling job in Fiji. While packing to leave, Angela hears the tune of an ice cream truck, and spots one outside her window. Fearing that Daryl is stalking her, she attempts to leave unnoticed, but is confronted by him outside. Angela flees on foot and travels to the agency, but finds the offices apparently empty. Before she can leave, she is confronted by Elmer, who emerges and tries to force her to pose for him. Realizing Elmer is obsessed with her, Angela attempts to fight him off, but a struggle ensues in which she lights him on fire, burning him to death. Daryl arrives at the agency, as does Madeline, as Angela escapes though a window. Daryl confronts Angela, and she expresses disgust for him. When she refers to the pig's head left in her bed, he responds with confusion, insisting he did not place it there. Moments later, Madeline, driving Daryl's truck, collides with him, killing him instantly. A shocked Angela is coaxed by Madeline into the truck, as Madeline tells her she will be late for her plane to Fiji.

Cast
Sigrid Thornton as Angela
Chantal Contouri as Madeline
Robert Bruning as Elmer
Hugh Keays-Byrne as Linsey
Denise Drysdale as Lily
Vincent Gil as Daryl

Production
Ginnane had originally intended to make a film after Patrick called Centrefold, based on a script by Chris Fitchett,  and raised money for it. He showed it to TV director Simon Wincer who only liked the fact the script was set in the modelling world and there was a Mr Whippy Van. Ginnane then commissioned Everett De Roche to write a new screenplay. Wincer says he and De Roche re-wrote it in three weeks, and the film took eleven weeks from the first day of shooting until sitting down with the release print.

Wincer planned to use a different actress to play Angela but she turned it down because she did not think the script was good enough "which was pretty amazing for someone who had only done television soap operas." Sigrid Thornton was cast two days before shooting started.

"It was a very easy film to make and probably my most pleasant experience to date" said Ginnane in 1979. The budget was $100,000 less than for Patrick (1978).

Ginnane then took the film to the US where he sat down with an editor and cut 12 minutes out of the film. According to Wincer, these were mostly lighter scenes, and a moment where it is explained Elmer is married to Madeline. This meant Wincer was not happy with the final result although he says "for what it is, it is quite a good little film."

The musical soundtrack was produced for release by Brian May and Phillip Powers for the 1M1 Records label many years later on CD under its overseas title.

Release
The film performed poorly at the Australian box office, only running a week in Melbourne, but sold very well overseas.

Home media
Snapshot was first released on DVD in the United States on 26 November 2002. A second release was made under the title The Day After Halloween via Scorpion Releasing on 24 July 2012 and was presented in its original aspect ratio of 2.35:1. It was given a Blu-ray release by Vinegar Syndrome under its original title on 29 August 2017 with special features including the Australian version presented in SD and extended interviews from Not Quite Hollywood.

References

External links

Snapshot at TCMDB
Snapshot at Australian Screen Online
Snapshot at Oz Movies

1979 films
Australian thriller films
Films directed by Simon Wincer
1970s English-language films
Films scored by Brian May (composer)
1979 directorial debut films
Films about modeling
Films about stalking
1970s thriller films